INS Chamak (K95) (Glitter) was the lead vessel of her class of fast attack craft of the Indian Navy.

References

Chamak-class missile boats
Fast attack craft of the Indian Navy
Museum ships in India
1976 ships